The Leone I Cabinet was the 18th cabinet of the Italian Republic, which held office from 22 June 1963 to 5 December 1963, for a total of 166 days, or 5 months and 13 days.

It was also knowns as Bridge government (Governo ponte), as a transitional government awaiting the recomposition of the internal currents of the PSI (led respectively by Riccardo Lombardi and Pietro Nenni) and its entry into the cabinet.

Composition

References

Italian governments
1963 establishments in Italy
1963 disestablishments in Italy
Cabinets established in 1963
Cabinets disestablished in 1963